The Scranton Miners was the name of several minor league baseball clubs that existed in Scranton, Pennsylvania, between 1886 and 1953.

The first Scranton Miners played in 1886 as the Scranton Indians a member of the Pennsylvania State League. The team played as the Miners in 1887, before jumping to the International League and playing as the Indians for the remainder of the season. In 1892, the name was revived again by a team in the Pennsylvania State League and until 1894. In 1895, the team played as the Scranton Coal Heavers. The third Scranton Miners team played in the Eastern League in 1896 and 1897. The Miners name was used again from 1899–1900 in the Atlantic League. The final incarnation of the Scranton team used the Miners' moniker from 1904–1953. The only exceptions were the years 1939–1943 and 1946–1951, when the team was known as the Scranton Red Sox. The 1946 Red Sox were recognized as one of the 100 greatest minor league teams of all time.

Season-by-season

Baseball parks
From 1894 until 1939, the Scranton Miners played at various iterations of "Brooks Athletic Field" which also was known as "Brooks Field", "Athletic Field", and in 1935 as "Sweeney's Field" after James T. Sweeney bought the property. The ballpark was located on Providence Road in Scranton and also was utilized by the St. Thomas College of Scranton Football team.

In 1932 the team began playing their Sunday games at Crystal Gardens Stadium in Dickson City due to Blue Laws banning games from being played on the Sabbath. According to the May 17th 1932 article in the Hazleton Plain Speaker, Centerfield at the new Crystal Gardens Stadium was so large (788 feet) that anyone who could hit a home run out of the new ballpark would "inherit the new stadium". The Left Field fence was 315 feet. Right Field was 416 feet. 

In 1940 a baseball stadium called "Scranton Stadium" aka "Scranton Dunmore Stadium" was built for the "Scranton Red Sox" who were often interchangeable with the "Scranton Miners" with the name going back and forth between the two from 1939 until 1954. The stadium existed for 14 years before it was demolished. It was located at 1350 Monroe Avenue in Dunmore Pennsylvania.

References

External links
Digitalballparks.com's Photographic history of all Eastern League Ballparks Since 1923
Digitalballparks.com's Photographic history of Scranton Dunmore Stadium

Scranton, Pennsylvania
Sports in the Scranton–Wilkes-Barre metropolitan area
Defunct International League teams
Defunct Eastern League (1938–present) teams
Defunct baseball teams in Pennsylvania
Pittsburgh Pirates minor league affiliates
Boston Red Sox minor league affiliates
Boston Braves minor league affiliates
St. Louis Browns minor league affiliates
Washington Senators minor league affiliates
1886 establishments in Pennsylvania
1953 disestablishments in Pennsylvania
Baseball teams established in 1886
Baseball teams disestablished in 1953